The Air Sylphe 447 is a French powered parachute that was designed and produced by Air Sylphe of Villereau, Nord. Now out of production, when it was available, the aircraft was supplied as a complete ready-to-fly-aircraft.

The company seems to have gone out of business in the end of 2007 and production ended by that date.

Design and development
It features a  parachute-style wing, single-place accommodation, tricycle landing gear and a single  Rotax 447 engine in pusher configuration. The  Rotax 503 engine was a factory option.

The aircraft carriage is built from metal tubing with a ducted fan derived from an industrial air ventilation system. The main landing gear incorporates spring rod suspension.

Specifications (Air Sylphe 447)

References

447
2000s French sport aircraft
2000s French ultralight aircraft
Single-engined pusher aircraft
Powered parachutes